Karl Wilhelm Heinrich von Kleist (1 November 1836, Brandenburg - 2 January 1917, Berlin) was a Prussian officer of the Imperial German Army, most recently General of the Cavalry (Germany). On the occasion of his 50th anniversary of service in 1906, Kleist was promoted to General of Cavalry.

Life

Hereditary Lineage
  
Karl Wilhelm Heinrich von Kleist came from the Eastern Pomerania nobility, widely branched into Prussia and the Baltic States Geschlecht Von Kleist. Within the family he belonged to the branch Kleist of Bornstedt Crown Estate to which the Prussian crown was approved on 11 April 1803, the name and coat of arms with the Association of Bornstedt. [1] He was the third son of the Prussian Major Ludwig Karl Kleist of Bornstedt ( 1772-1854), inheriting commissioner on Hohennauen, and his second wife Wilhelmine von Hanstein (1818-1869) [2]

Military career

Because he would not inherit his father's entailed estate, Kleist chose the military profession. He resigned on March 6, 1856 as an ensign in the 10th Hussars Regiment of the Prussian army, where he was appointed on 5 February 1857 Second Lieutenant. Kleist spent a very long time as a lieutenant with multiple dislocations to other units. He was made on December 15, 1863 the adjutant of the 8th Cavalry Brigade, 1866 adjutant of the 7th Division (German Empire) and there promoted on July 20, 1866 to first lieutenant. Again adjutant, this time in the 11th Cavalry Brigade, he was finally supernumerary leaving in his post as a captain. On December 14, 1868, he came back to his unit and was squadron leader. Finally, he was on October 24, 1871 General Staff officer in the 13th Division, after he had previously been seconded for several months to the Great General Staff. Since September 10, 1872, he was a Major. After further uses in various positions on the General Staff, he returned in 1878 back to the military service and became final after a period of temporary assignment Commander of the Dragoon Regiment No. 19 and lieutenant colonel. In 1883 he was promoted to colonel and appointed commander of the 25th (Grand Ducal Hessian) Cavalry Brigade and 1888 Major General. Finally, the emperor appointed him on 18 October 1891 the commander of the 10th Division in Poznań and to Lieutenant General. In 1898 he was called into question.

On the occasion of its 50th anniversary service in 1906 Kleist was promoted to General of the cavalry. [3]

Family
Kleist was married on June 19, 1869 to Clare Gordon (born July 6, 1849 in Breslau, † 1920), daughter of the Prussian General of the Infantry Helmuth von Gordon [4].

Awards
 Red Eagle Order 3rd Class with Swords on Ring 
 Order of the Crown (Prussia) 2nd Class 
 Iron Cross 2nd Class (1870)
 Order of the Zähringer Lion Knight's Cross 1st Class with Oak Leaves and Swords
 Oldenburg House and Merit Order of Duke Peter Frederick Louis

References

Notes

Citations

 Genealogical Handbook of the nobility. A band XIII. 322 S. C. A. Strong-Verlag. Limburg. In 1975. 
 Genealogist. Handbook, op. S. 324 
 Gustav Kratz: Ibid. Supplement to Volume III. S. 175 
 Kurt von Priesdorff: soldierly Führertum. Volume 7 Hanseatic Hamburg publishing house. o.J. S. 310

Bibliography

 Gustav Kratz u.a.: Die Geschichte des Geschlechts von Kleist (The History of von Kleist), Band III, Nr. 775, Seite 454 PDF

External links 
 Homepage of the family von Kleist

1836 births
1917 deaths
Generals of Cavalry (Prussia)
Recipients of the Iron Cross (1870), 2nd class
Karl Wilhelm
Military personnel from Brandenburg